Ray Butler may refer to:

Ray Butler (American football) (born 1956), retired American football wide receiver
Ray Butler (politician) (born 1965), Irish Fine Gael politician

See also
Butler (surname)